The Buffalo and South Western Railroad was a predecessor of the Erie Railroad that ran 89 miles between Jamestown, NY and Buffalo, NY.

History 

The Buffalo and Jamestown Railroad was incorporated on March 23, 1872, to build a line between Buffalo and Jamestown. The road was opened in sections and was completed in July 1875. The line was never financially successful and Buffalo and Jamestown Railroad was sold on December 12, 1877, to the Buffalo and South Western Railroad.

The Buffalo and South Western Railroad was short-lived and was leased by the New York, Lake Erie and Western Railroad on August 1, 1880, for an annual rental of 35 percent of the gross earnings for the line. On November 19, 1895, the Erie officially merged the Buffalo and South Western by virtue of owning 100 percent of the B&SW stock.

Current status 

Much of the line operated by the Buffalo and South Western Railroad still sees use. The Buffalo Southern Railroad operates the portion from Buffalo to the Erie County line at Gowanda and the New York and Lake Erie Railroad operates the line south from Gowanda to South Dayton, including an excursion train that runs in the summer.

Additionally, since 2016, under the auspices of the Buffalo, Cattaraugus & Jamestown Scenic Railway, a not for profit organization, Buffalo Southern hosted and provided motive power for seasonal excursions from Hamburg to Water Valley New York.

References 

 Minor, George. 1911. The Erie System. New York, NY: Erie Railroad Company.

Defunct New York (state) railroads
Predecessors of the Erie Railroad
Railway companies established in 1877
Railway companies disestablished in 1895
1877 establishments in New York (state)